Nokha may refer to:
 Nokha, Bikaner, town in Bikaner district, Rajasthan
 Nokha, Rohtas, town in Rohtas District, Bihar
 Nokha, Bihar Assembly constituency, one of the 243 assembly constituencies of Bihar
 Nokha, Rajasthan Assembly constituency